Melvin Lintern (born 17 May 1950) is an English former footballer who played one game at inside-forward for Port Vale in May 1967. After a non-playing spell with Carlisle United, he later played non-league football for Stafford Rangers and Hanley Town.

Career
Lintern graduated through Port Vale juniors to make a substitute appearance for the first team in a 2–0 defeat by Brentford at Griffin Park on 13 May 1967, the last day of the Fourth Division campaign. He signed professional forms at Vale Park under Stanley Matthews in March 1968, but was given a free transfer two months later. Lintern later had spells with Carlisle United (without appearing for the first team), Stafford Rangers (Northern Premier League) and Hanley Town.

Career statistics
Source:

References

1950 births
Living people
People from Seaton Delaval
Footballers from Northumberland
English footballers
Association football forwards
Port Vale F.C. players
Carlisle United F.C. players
Stafford Rangers F.C. players
Hanley Town F.C. players
English Football League players
Northern Premier League players